Achenoderus octomaculatus is a species of beetle in the family Cerambycidae, the only species in the genus Achenoderus.

References

Compsocerini